In mechanics:
X-ring, type of mechanical gasket similar to O-ring
In transmissions:
 X-ring chain, A roller chain commonly used in high performance motorcycles.
In other fields:
X-ring, ring awarded to students of St. Francis Xavier University